Masainas is a comune (municipality) in the Province of South Sardinia in the Italian region Sardinia, located about  southwest of Cagliari and about  southeast of Carbonia.  It is part of the Sulcis traditional region.

Masainas borders the following municipalities: Giba, Piscinas, Sant'Anna Arresi, Teulada.

References

Cities and towns in Sardinia
1975 establishments in Italy
States and territories established in 1975